Wide load or wideload refers to:

 Oversize load
 Wideload Games, a video games development studio